The 2019–20 season was SD Huesca's 60th season in existence and the club's first season back in the second division of Spanish football. In addition to the domestic league, SD Huesca participated in this season's edition of the Copa del Rey. The season was slated to cover a period from 1 July 2019 to 30 June 2020. It was extended extraordinarily beyond 30 June due to the COVID-19 pandemic in Spain.

Following a 3–0 win over CD Numancia on 17 July 2020, Huesca won immediate promotion back to La Liga for the 2020–21 season as champions.

Players

Current squad
.

Out on loan

Pre-season and friendlies

Competitions

Overview

Segunda División

League table

Results summary

Results by round

Matches
The fixtures were revealed on 4 July 2019.

Copa del Rey

Statistics

Appearances and goals
Last updated on 20 July 2020.

|-
! colspan=10 style=background:#dcdcdc; text-align:center|Goalkeepers

|-
! colspan=10 style=background:#dcdcdc; text-align:center|Defenders

|-
! colspan=14 style=background:#dcdcdc; text-align:center|Midfielders

|-
! colspan=14 style=background:#dcdcdc; text-align:center|Forwards

|-
! colspan=14 style=background:#dcdcdc; text-align:center| Players who have made an appearance or had a squad number this season but have left the club

|}

Notes

References

External links

SD Huesca seasons
SD Huesca